Moshe Nathanson (August 10, 1899 - February 24, 1981) was a Canadian musicologist, composer, and cantor who is known for promoting Jewish folk music. Nathanson's most notable work is Zamru Lo and the Hava Nagila.

Biography

Early life and education 

Nathanson was born on August 10, 1899, in Jerusalem, the son of Rabbi Nachum Hirsh Nathanson and Rosa (née Silberstern) Nathanson. He attended a heder school. When Nathanson was ten he was sent to study at Bet Sefer Lemell an elementary school in Jerusalem. The school choir was run by Abraham Zvi Idelsohn challenged his students to select words for a nigun and create a modern Hebrew song. It cited that a twelve year old Nathanson suggested (Psalm 118: 24), "Zeh hayom asah Adonai; nagila v’nismekha vo" inspiring the famous Hava Nagila.

Nathanson left Jerusalem and immigrated to Quebec, Canada on September 7, 1920, where he later began to attend McGill University in 1922 where he pursued a law degree but later transferred to Juilliard School of Music to pursue his passion for music.

Career 
Nathanson began his career in 1924 when he joined The Society for the Advancement of Judaism (SAJ) as their cantor during the tenure of Rabbi Mordecai M. Kaplan. partook in many educational programs to promote Israeli folk and worked for The Bureau of Jewish Education and focused on teaching Jewish youth about their culture and heritage through song and worked as the musical director of The Kvutzah and Camp Achva. Among other works, he set Esther Zweig's text "Salute to Haganah" to music in 1948.

Personal life 
Moshe married Zipora Bor (April 2, 1901 - January 12, 1978) on July 1, 1924, in Brooklyn, New York, with whom he had three children: Deena Starr (January 16, 1931 - March 27, 2014), Naomi Brettler (July 16, 1932), and Yaron Nathanson (July 22, 1926 - February 23, 2003). On February 24, 1981 Moshe Nathanson died at his home on 15 West 86th Street, in Manhattan. He was buried at Mount Hebron Cemetery alongside his wife Zipora who predeceased him.

References 

Canadian musicologists
Canadian male composers
Hazzans
1899 births
1981 deaths
20th-century Canadian male musicians
20th-century musicologists